ProTec - Professional Technical and Recreational Diving is an international dive training agency based in Munich, Germany.

ProTec was founded in 1997. ProTec offers diving education standards and training procedures for beginners through to advanced and diving professionals. This standards and procedures are used by dive instructors to conduct training courses for divers. ProTec is accredited with authorities in Spain, Egypt and with the German DIN-EN-ISO Institute for the ProTec diver ISO levels and the ProTec instructor ISO ranks.

Training and certification system 
Dive training at ProTec consists of theoretical and practical units as with most other diving agencies. There is a division into 2 main areas: Freediving and Scuba diving. The scuba certifications are divided into recreational diving and technical diving. Where recreational is further subdivided into Introduction and core and specialties. Similar also at the technical certifications.

ProTec has – unlike other agencies - for a few main levels two kind of certification system in the program. The internationally known certifications OWD, AOWD, DM (based on RSTC standards) and the European certification system according to CMAS guidelines (1,2,3 - star system).

Recreational diving, scuba Introduction and scuba core

 Intro Scuba – an Introduction to Scuba Diving according ISO 11121. At ProTec this is only a preliminary step to the beginner certifications.
 Basic Scuba Diver - supervised diver (ISO 24801-1), entry level certification.
 Junior OWD - supervised diver (ISO 24801-1), simplified open water diver certification for children aged 10 years and over.
 OWD - autonomous diver (ISO 24801-2), open water diver certification
 1* Diver - autonomous diver (ISO 24801-2), according to CMAS 1 STAR program
 AOWD - advanced open water diver certification
 2** Diver - according to CMAS 2 STAR program
 Master Diver
 3** Diver - according to CMAS 3 STAR program
 Dive Master - (ISO 24801-3), Divemaster, dive guide
 Dive Supervisor – from professional dive guide to dive director, non-teaching
 Assistant Instructor - (ISO 24802-1)
 Prime Scuba Instructor - (ISO 24802-2)
 Speciality or Technical Instructor according to speciality or technical diving course
 Master Scuba Instructor
 Assistant Instructor Trainer
 Instructor Trainer
 IC Inspector

Recreational diving, scuba specialties

 Night Diver
 Advanced Navigation
 Search & Recovery
 MFA - Medical First Aid (non-diving course)
 O2P - Oxygen Provider (non-diving course)
 AED - Automated External Defibrillator (non-diving course)
 Rescue – MFA and O2P are included among the prerequisites, AED is an option
 Equipment Maintenance
 Nitrox 1 – diving with standard Nitrox mixtures 28-32-36-till 40% O2 (ISO 11107)
 Current / Drift 
 Cavern - moderate (overhead environment) 
 Wreck - recreational wreck diving means little to moderate overhead environment
 Ice - moderate overhead environment)
 Dry suit
 Deep – maximum depth is 40 m, no decompression dives
 Boat - how to dive from a boat (safe exit and entry procedures)
 Scooter – UW DPV
 UW Photo / Video
 Self Reliant / Solo

Technical diving (scuba)

 Nitrox 2 – Advanced Nitrox
 Gas Blender 1 – (ISO 13293) covers Nitrox
 Gas Blender 2 – (ISO 13293) covers Nitrox, Trimix
 Intro Trimix – Trimix 1, max. 45m, Normoxic TRX
 Normoxic Trimix – Trimix 2, max. 60m, Normoxic TRX
 Advanced Trimix – Trimix 3, max. 90m
 Advanced Deep – max. 45m on Air/NX
 Extended Range - max. 55m on Air/NX
 Intro Wreck  technical wreck level 1
 TEC Wreck – technical wreck level 2
 Advanced Wreck – technical wreck level 3
 Intro Cave – technical cave level 1
 Full Cave – technical cave level 2
 Advanced Cave – technical cave level 3
 Rebreather – with depth levels from 40m to 100m per class/type (manual/electronic/hybrid)
Freediving

 Discover Snorkel Diving, Introduction ABC
 Skin Diver
 Apnea 1 
 Apnea 2
 Apnea 3

External links 

 Official ProTec website 
 https://diveassure.com/en-intl/approved-certifying-agencies/

References 

Underwater diving training organizations